Flavius Eusebius (died c. AD 350) was a Roman military officer and politician, and is usually identified as the posthumous father-in-law of the Roman emperor Constantius II.

Biography
Born in Thessalonica to a family of Macedonian descent, Eusebius served prior to AD 347 as the Magister equitum et peditum in the east, probably under the emperor Constantius II. During his time as military commander, he intervened in Armenia, possibly to suppress the revolt of Bacour.

After he had retired from this post, he held the rank of Comes and was made consul posterior alongside Vulcacius Rufinus in AD 347.

Eusebius was probably a Christian. He had at least three children: his sons Flavius Eusebius and Flavius Hypatius held the consulship together in AD 359, and his daughter Eusebia married Emperor Constantius II after her father had died.

Sources
 Martindale, J. R.; Jones, A. H. M, The Prosopography of the Later Roman Empire, Vol. I AD 260–395, Cambridge University Press (1971)

References

350 deaths
4th-century Romans
Flavii
Late Roman Empire political office-holders
Magistri equitum (Roman Empire)
Magistri peditum
Imperial Roman consuls
Year of birth unknown
Year of death uncertain